WEEH-LP (100.5 FM, "Oldies 100.5, The Oldies Station") is a low-power FM radio station broadcasting an oldies music format. Licensed to Hart, Michigan, United States, the station is currently owned by Oceana Broadcasters, Inc. and features programming from USA Radio Network.

History
The Federal Communications Commission issued a construction permit for the station on October 3, 2002. The station was assigned the WEEH-LP call sign on October 14, 2002, and received its license to cover on February 3, 2004.

References

External links

EEH-LP
Oldies radio stations in the United States
Radio stations established in 2004
EEH-LP